The 2022 Münsterland Giro (known as the Sparkasse Münsterland Giro for sponsorship reasons) was the 16th edition of the Münsterland Giro road cycling one day race, held mostly in the titular region of northwest Germany on 3 October 2022.

Teams 
Ten of the 19 UCI WorldTeams, three UCI ProTeams, five UCI Continental teams, and the German national team made up the 19 teams that participated in the race. In total, 117 riders started the race.

UCI WorldTeams

 
 
 
 
 
 
 
 
 
 

UCI ProTeams

 
 
 

UCI Continental Teams

 
 
 
 
 

National Teams

 Germany

Result

References

Sources

External links 
  

Münsterland Giro
Münsterland Giro
2022 in German sport